Johannes Hendrikus Jacques "Hans" van Zeeland (born May 4, 1954 in Arnhem) is a former water polo player from the Netherlands, who won the bronze medal with the Dutch National Team at the 1976 Summer Olympics in Montreal. In 1980 Van Zeeland finished in sixth position with the Holland squad. Sixteen years later he was the head coach of the Dutch Men's National Team at the 1996 Summer Olympics in Atlanta, United States.

See also
 List of Olympic medalists in water polo (men)

External links
 

1954 births
Living people
Dutch male water polo players
Olympic bronze medalists for the Netherlands in water polo
Water polo players at the 1976 Summer Olympics
Water polo players at the 1980 Summer Olympics
Sportspeople from Arnhem
Medalists at the 1976 Summer Olympics
20th-century Dutch people
Coaches at the 1996 Summer Olympics
Dutch water polo coaches